Cuming Township, Nebraska may refer to the following places in Nebraska:

 Cuming Township, Cuming County, Nebraska
 Cuming Township, Dodge County, Nebraska

Nebraska township disambiguation pages